This is a list of video games developed or published by Hudson Soft. The following dates are based on the earliest release, typically in Japan. While Hudson Soft started releasing video games in 1978, it was not until 1983 that the company began to gain serious notability among the video gaming community.

PC-8800 series
 1983
 Binary Land
 Bomberman
 Dezeni Land
 Hitsuji ya-i
 1984
 Donkey Kong 3: Dai Gyakushū
 Mario Bros. Special
 Nuts & Milk
 Punch Ball Mario Bros.
 Salad no Kuni no Tomato Hime 
 1985
 Balloon Fight
 Excitebike
 Golf
 Ice Climber 
 Tennis
 1986
 Super Mario Bros. Special
 1987
 Dione
1988
 Halanipla

X1
 1984
 Hanafuda
 1986
 Super Mario Bros. Special

MSX
 1983
 3D Bomberman 
 Binary Land
 Bomberman
 Cannon Ball
 Indian No Bouken
 Killer Station
 MJ-05
 Submarine Shooter
 Super Doors
 The Spider
 Stop the Express (Bousou Tokkyuu Sos; Japanese title)
 1984
 Fire Rescue
 Hitsuji Yai Pretty Sheep
 Kaeru Shooter
 Machinegun Joe vs the Mafia
 Nuts & Milk
 Salad no Kuni no Tomato Hime
 1985
 Binary Land
 Challenger
 Star Force
 1986
 Hudson's Adventure Island
 Bomberman Special
 Star Soldier
 1987
 Jagur 5
 1988
 Wonder Boy
 Bomber King

ZX Spectrum
 1983
 Bomberman
 Bubble Buster
 Cannon Ball
 Driller Tanks
 Itasundorious
 Stop the Express
 1984
 Frog Shooter
 Vegetable Crash

Commodore Amiga
 1991
 Dynablaster
 1992
 BC Kid
 1993
 Yo! Joe! - Beat the Ghosts

IBM PC and Compatibles
 1991
 Dynablaster
 1993
 Yo! Joe! - Beat the Ghosts

PC Engine/TurboGrafx-16
 1987
 China Warrior
 Bikkuriman World
 J.J. & Jeff (Kato-chan & Ken-chan; Japanese version)
 Shanghai
 Victory Run
 1988
 Jaseiken Necromancer
 Yū Yū Jinsei
 R-Type Part I
 R-Type Part II
 Sengoku Mahjong
 Keith Courage in Alpha Zones
 Sadakichi Sebun: Hideyoshi no Ougon
 Appare! Gate Ball
 World Class Baseball
 1989
 Dungeon Explorer
 Military Madness
 Neutopia
 Blazing Lazers
 Bonk's Adventure
 Power Golf
 Power League II
 Susano-ou Densetsu
 Super Momotaro Dentetsu
 1990
 Aero Blasters
 Aoi Blink
 Bomberman
 Chew Man Fu
 Cratermaze
 Maniac Pro Wrestling
 Momotaro Densetsu Turbo
 Momotaro Densetsu II
 Momotarō Katsugeki
 Dragon's Curse
 Power League III
 Super Star Soldier
 Timeball
 1991
 Final Soldier
 Neutopia II
 Power Eleven
 Shockman
 Jackie Chan's Action Kung Fu
 Bonk's Revenge
 Populous
 Power League 4
 Raiden
 Super Momotaro Dentetsu II
 Doraemon Nobita no Dorabian Night
 1992
 Soldier Blade
 World Sports Competition
 New Adventure Island
 Bomberman '93
 Air Zonk
 Ninja Gaiden
 Power League V
 Honō no Tōkyūji: Dodge Danpei
 Momotaro Densetsu Gaiden Dai Ichi Shu
 1993
 Bomberman '94
 Bonk 3: Bonk's Big Adventure
 Battle Lode Runner
 Power League '93
 Power Tennis

PC Engine CD ROM/TurboGrafx-CD
 1988
 No.Ri.Ko Ogawa Noriko
 Fighting Street
 Bikkuriman Daijikai
 1989
 Cobra - Kokuryū Oh no Densetsu
 Tengai Makyō Ziria
 Wonder Boy III: Monster Lair
 Gambler Jiko Chūshinha - Gekitō 36 Janshi
 Ys I & II
 1990
 Mitsubachi Gakuen
 Shanghai II
 Urusei Yatsura: Stay With You
 J.B. Harold Murder Club
 1991
 Cobra II - Densetsu no Otoko
 Ys III: Wanderers from Ys
 Seiryū Densetsu Monbit
 Pomping World
 Dragon Slayer Eiyū Densetsu
 Populous: The Promised Lands
 Super CD-ROM² Taiken Soft Shū
 1992
 Tengai Makyō II: Manji Maru
 Super Raiden
 Riot Zone
 Star Parodier
 Gate of Thunder
 1992 Hudson CD-ROM² Ongaku Zenshū
 Adventure Quiz Capcom World Hatena no Daibōken
 Records of Lodoss War
 Doraemon Nobita no Dorabian Night
 Quiz Nobunaga no Yabō
 Ginga Ojōsama Densetsu Yuna
 Dragon Slayer: The Legend of Heroes II
 Inoue Mami: Kono Hoshi ni Tatta Hitori no Kimi
 1993
 SimEarth
 Nadia: The Secret of Blue Water
 Dungeon Explorer II
 Lords of Thunder
 Quiz Caravan Cult Q
 Super Air Zonk: Rockabilly-Paradise
 Tengai Makyō: Fuun Kabukiden
 Ys IV: The Dawn of Ys
 1994
 Bakuchō Yoshimoto Shinkigeki
 Power Golf 2
 The Dynastic Hero
 Bomberman: Panic Bomber
 Ryūkō no Ken
 World Heroes 2
 Neo Nectaris
 Garō Densetsu 2
 Garō Densetsu Special
 Blood Gear
 Hyper Wars
 Records of Lodoss War II
 1995
 Kabuki Ittō Ryōdan
 Gulliver Boy
 Ginga Ojōsama Densetsu Yuna 2
 Hyakumonogatari: Honto ni Atta Kowai Hanashi
 Ginga Fukei Densetsu Sapphire
 Seiya Monogatari

PC Engine Best Collection refers to a series of video game compilations produced by Hudson Soft and released only in Japan in 2008 for the PlayStation Portable handheld system.

 Note: the Ginga Ojousama Densetsu Yuna franchise is known in the West as Galaxy Fräulein Yuna; Sapphire is in fact unrelated to this franchise (except for sharing the character designer, Mika Akitaka).

PC Engine SuperGrafx
 1989
 Battle Ace
 1990
 Madō King Granzort
 1991
 Aldynes
 1941: Counter Attack

Sega Mega Drive/Genesis
 1994
 Mega Bomberman

Sega Mega-CD/Sega CD
 1995
 Dungeon Explorer
 Lords of Thunder
 The Space Adventure

Sega Game Gear
 1995
 Super Momotarou Dentetsu III

Sega Saturn
 1996
 Kuso Kagaku Sekai Gulliver Boy
 Saturn Bomberman
 Ginga Ojousama Densetsu Yuna: Mika Akitaka Illust Works
 Ginga Ojousama Densetsu Yuna: Remix
 1997
 Tengai Makyo: Daiyon no Mokushiroku: The Apocalypse IV
 Anearth Fantasy Stories: The First Volume
 Willy Wombat
 Bulk Slash
 Koden Koureijutsu Hyaku Monogatari: Hontoni Atta Kowai Hanashi
 Virus
 Momotarou Douchuuki
 Ginga Ojousama Densetsu Yuna 3: Lightning Angel
 Saturn Bomberman Fight!!
 Ginga Ojousama Densetsu Yuna: Mika Akitaka Illust Works 2
 1998
 Kindaichi Shounen no Jikenbo: Hoshimitou Kanashimi no Hukushuuki
 Shiroki Majo: Mouhitotsu no Eiyuu Densetsu
 Denpa Shounenteki Game
 Bomberman Wars
 Shadows of the Tusk

Dreamcast
 1999
 Kita He: White Illumination
 Elemental Gimmick Gear
 Denpa Shounen-teki Kenshou Seikatsu: Nasubi no Heya
 Kita He: Photo Memories
 Super Producers: Mezase Show Biz Kai
 2000
 Rune Jade
 Sonic Shuffle
 2001
 Typing of the Death
 Bomberman Online

Famicom/Nintendo Entertainment System
 1984
 4 Nin Uchi Mahjong
 Lode Runner
 Nuts & Milk
 1985
 Binary Land
 Bomberman
 Challenger
 Championship Lode Runner
 Pooyan
 Raid on Bungeling Bay
 Star Force
 1986
 Hudson's Adventure Island
 Milon's Secret Castle
 Ninja Hattori-kun
 Star Soldier
 Doraemon
 1987
 Faxanadu
 Mickey Mousecapade
 Momotaro Densetsu
 Robowarrior
 Starship Hector
 Takahashi Meijin no Bug-tte Honey
 The Adventures of Dino Riki
 1988
 Momotaro Dentetsu
 Princess Tomato in the Salad Kingdom
 Xexyz
 1989
 Seirei Gari
 1990
 Bikkuriman World: Gekitou Sei Senshi
 Castle Quest
 Jackie Chan's Action Kung Fu
 Klax (Japan; licensed from Tengen)
 Mashin Eiyuden Wataru Gaiden
 Mendel Palace
 1991
 Adventure Island II
 Bomberman II
 1992
 Adventure Island 3
 Felix the Cat
 Super Momotaro Dentetsu
 1993
 Bonk's Adventure
 Momotarou Densetsu Gaiden
 1994
 Adventure Island 4
 Beauty and the Beast

Game Boy series
 1990
 Bomber Boy (Game Boy)
 Klax (Game Boy)
 1991
 Jikuu Senki Mu (Game Boy)
 Momotaro Densetsu Gaiden (Game Boy)
 Super Momotaro Dentetsu (Game Boy)
 1992
 Adventure Island (Game Boy)
 Bonk's Adventure (Game Boy)
 Honō no Dōkyūji: Dodge Danpei (Game Boy)
 1993
 Adventure Island II: Aliens in Paradise (Game Boy)
 Buster Brothers (Game Boy)
 Castle Quest (Game Boy)
 Felix the Cat (Game Boy)
 Milon's Secret Castle (Game Boy)
 Momotaro Dengeki: Momotaro Thunderbolt (Game Boy)
 1994
 Bomberman GB / Wario Blast: Featuring Bomberman! (Game Boy)
 Bonk's Revenge (Game Boy)
 GB Genjin Land: Viva! Chikkun Ōkoku (Game Boy)
 Momotaro Dengeki 2: Momotaro Thunderbolt (Game Boy)
 Super Momotaro Dentetsu II (Game Boy)
 1995
 Bomberman GB 2 (Game Boy)
 1996
 Bomberman Collection (Game Boy)
 Bomberman GB 3 (Game Boy)
 Genjin Collection (Game Boy)
 Momotaro Collection (Game Boy)
 Momotaro Collection 2 (Game Boy)
 1997
 Pocket Bomberman (Game Boy)
 Game Boy Wars TURBO (Game Boy)
 SameGame (Game Boy)
 Super B-Daman: Fighting Phoenix (Game Boy)
 1998
 Pocket Bomberman (Game Boy Color)
 Bomberman Quest (Game Boy Color)
 Daikaijū Monogatari: Miracle of the Zone (Game Boy)
 Game Boy Wars 2 (Game Boy)
 Chōsoku Supinā (Game Boy)
 Momotarou Dentetsu Jr.: Zenkoku Ramen Meguri no Maki (Game Boy)
 Nectaris GB (Game Boy)
 Pocket Family GB (Game Boy)
 Pokémon Trading Card Game (Game Boy Color)
 Robopon (Game Boy Color)
 1999
 Bomberman Max (Game Boy Color)
 Daikaijuu Monogatari: The Miracle of the Zone II (Game Boy Color)
 Poyon no Dungeon Room (Game Boy Color)
 2000
 Beyblade Fighting Tournament (Game Boy Color)
 Grandia: Parallel Trippers (Game Boy Color)
 Poyon no Dungeon Room 2 (Game Boy Color)
 2001
 Bakuten Shoot Beyblade (Game Boy Color)
 Bomberman Tournament (Game Boy Advance)
 Game Boy Wars 3 (Game Boy Color)
 Mahjong Detective (Game Boy Advance)
 Minnie & Friends: Yume no Kuni o Sagashite (Game Boy Color)
 Momotarou Matsuri (Game Boy Advance)
 Morita Shogi Advance (Game Boy Advance)
 Pokémon Card GB2: Here Comes Team Great Rocket! (Pokémon Card GB2: Great Rocket-Dan Sanjō!; Japanese title) (Game Boy Color)
 Hatena Satena (Game Boy Advance)
 2002
 Beast Shooter: Mezase Beast King (Game Boy Advance)
 Beyblade (Game Boy Advance)
 Bobobo-bo Bo-bobo: Ougi 87.5 Bakuretsu Hanage Shinken (Game Boy Advance)
 Bomberman Jetters (Game Boy Advance)
 Bomberman Max 2 (Game Boy Advance)
 Dr. Rin ni Kiitemite! (Game Boy Color)
 Blender Bros. (Game Boy Advance)
 Pinobee & Phoebee (Game Boy Advance)
 2003
 Bobobo-bo Bo-bobo: Majide!!? Shinken Shoubu (Game Boy Advance)
 Ninja Five-O (Game Boy Advance)
 Oriental Blue: Ao no Tengai (Game Boy Advance)
 2004
 Bobobo-bo Bo-bobo: 9 Kiwame Senshi Gyagu Yuugou (Game Boy Advance)
 Bobobo-bo Bo-bobo: Backutou Hajike Taisen (Game Boy Advance)
 2005
 Hudson Best Collections (Game Boy Advance)
 Mario Party Advance (Game Boy Advance)
 Momotaro Dentetsu G: Gold Deck o Tsukure! (Game Boy Advance)

Super Famicom/Super NES
 1991
 Bill Laimbeer's Combat Basketball
 1992
 Earth Light
 Super Adventure Island
 Battle Grand Prix
 Super Momotarou Dentetsu II
 1993
 Dig & Spike Volleyball
 Elfaria
 Super Bomberman
 Shin Momotaro Densetsu
 Inspector Gadget
 Super Power League
 1994
 Super Adventure Island II
 Hagane: The Final Conflict
 J.League Super Soccer
 Super Bonk
 Super Bomberman 2
 An American Tail: Fievel Goes West
 Beauty and the Beast
 Daikaijū Monogatari
 Super Momotarou Dentetsu III
 Super Power League 2
 1995
 SWAT Kats
 J.League Super Soccer '95 Jikkyō Stadium
 Super Genjin 2 (Super Bonk 2)
 Super Bomberman 3
 Far East of Eden Zero
 Caravan Shooting Collection
 Crystal Beans From Dungeon Explorer
 Elfaria 2: The Quest of the Meld
 Kishin Douji Zenki: Batoru Raiden
 Kishin Douji Zenki: Denei Raibu
 Saikyō: Takada Nobuhiko
 The Sporting News: Power Baseball
 Super Bomberman: Panic Bomber W
 Super Momotarou Dentetsu DX
 Super Power League 3
 1996
 Bomberman B-Daman
 Daikaijū Monogatari 2
 DoReMi Fantasy: Milon no DokiDoki Daibouken
 Earth Light: Luna Strike
 J.League '96 Dream Stadium
 Kishin Douji Zenki: Tenchi Meidou
 Momotarou Dentetsu Happy
 Same Game
 Super Bomberman 4
 Super Power League 4
 1997
 Bakukyuu Renpatsu!! Super B-Daman
 Super Bomberman 5

Virtual Boy
 1995
 Panic Bomber
 Vertical Force

Nintendo 64
 1997
 Bomberman 64
 Ucchannanchan no Honō no Challenger: Denryū Iraira Bō (Fire Electric Pen)
 Dual Heroes
 J-League Eleven Beat 1997
 Power League 64
 1998
 Bomberman Hero
 Centre Court Tennis
 Getter Love!!: Chō Renai Party Game Tanjō
 Mario Party
 New Japan Pro Wrestling: Tohkon Road Brave Spirits
 New Japan Pro Wrestling: Tohkon Road Brave Spirits 2, The Next Generation
 Star Soldier: Vanishing Earth
 Super B-Daman: Battle Phoenix 64
 1999
 Bomberman 64: The Second Attack
 Mario Party 2
 Robot Ponkottsu 64: Nanatsu no Umi no Caramel
 Last Legion UX
 2000
 Mario Party 3
 2001
 Bomberman 64 (2001 version)

GameCube
 2002
 Bloody Roar: Primal Fury
 Bomberman Generation
 Bomberman Jetters
 Disney's Party
 Mario Party 4
 2003
 BeyBlade: Super Tournament Battle
 Bomberman Land 2
 DreamMix TV World Fighters
  Hudson Selection Volume 1: Cubic Lode Runner
  Hudson Selection Volume 2: Star Soldier
 Hudson Selection Volume 3: Bonk's Adventure
 Hudson Selection Volume 4: Adventure Island
 Mario Party 5
 2004
 Mario Party 6
 2005
 Frogger: Ancient Shadow
 Mario Party 7

Wii
 2006
 Kororinpa: Marble Mania
 Wing Island
 2007
 Bomberman Land (Wii)
 Fishing Master
 Mario Party 8
 Jigsawpuzzle: Kyo no Wanko
 Crossword
 2008
 Deca Sports
 Bomberman Blast
 Help Wanted
 Karaoke Joysound Wii
 2009
 Marble Saga: Kororinpa
 Deca Sports 2
 2010
 Calling
 Lost in Shadow
 Rooms: The Main Building
 Deca Sports 3
 Oops! Prank Party

WiiWare
 2008
 Star Soldier R
 Bomberman Blast
 Alien Crush Returns
 Tetris Party
 My Aquarium
 Cue Sports: Snooker vs Billiards
 Pit Crew Panic!
 Pop Them, Drop Them, SameGame
 2009
 Snowboard Riot
 Onslaught
 Water Warfare
 Adventure Island: The Beginning
 2010
 Military Madness: Nectaris
 Diner Dash

Nintendo DS
 2005
 Bomberman
 2006
 Bomberman Land Touch!
 Honeycomb Beat
 2007
 Bomberman Story DS
 Bomberman Land Touch! 2
 Mario Party DS
 Zettai Onkan Otodamaster
 2008
 Dungeon Explorer: Warriors of Ancient Arts
 Bomberman 2
 2009
 Metal Fight Beyblade
 Miami Law
 MySims Party
 Deca Sports DS
 2010
 Rooms: The Main Building

DSiWare
 2009
 Sudoku 50! For Beginners (Sudoku Student in North America)
 Sudoku 150! (Sudoku 150! For Challengers in Europe, Sudoku Master in North America)
 Illustlogic
 Bomberman Blitz
 2010
 16 Shot! Shooting Watch

Nintendo 3DS
 2011
 Deca Sports Extreme
 Tetris: Axis
 Nikoli's Pencil Puzzle

PlayStation
 1997
 Bloody Roar
 1998
 B.L.U.E. Legend of Water
 Bomberman Fantasy Race
 Bomberman Party Edition
 Bomberman Wars
 Bomberman World
 Hello Kitty: White Present
 1999
 Bloody Roar 2
 Pi to Mail
 Pocket Family: Happy Family Plan
 Weltorv Estleia
 2000
 Bomberman Land
 2002
 Digimon Rumble Arena
 PinobeeIGN

PlayStation 2
 2001
 Bloody Roar 3
 2002
 Bomberman Jetters
 Drift Champ
 2003
 Boboboubo Boubobo: Hajike Matsuri
 Bomberman Kart
 Bloody Roar 4
 Bomberman Land 2
 DreamMix TV World Fighters
  Hudson Selection Volume 1: Cubic Lode Runner
  Hudson Selection Volume 2: Star Soldier
 Hudson Selection Volume 3: Bonk's Adventure
 Hudson Selection Volume 4: Adventure Island
 2004
 Boboboubo Boubobo: Shuumare! Taikan Boubobo
 Bomberman Kart DX
 Sakigake!! Kuromati Koukou - Kore wa Hyottoshite Game Nanoka! Hen
 Bomberman Battles/Bomberman Hardball
 2005
 Bomberman Land 3
 Others
 Net de Bomberman
 Kamaitachi no Yoru x3
 Kita He ~ Diamond Dust ~
 Momotaro Densetsu 11
 Momotaro Densetsu 12
 Momotaro Densetsu 15
 Momotaro Densetsu 16
 Momotaro Densetsu USA
 Momotaro Densetsu X
 Tengai Makyou II: Manjimaru
 Tengai Makyou III: Namida

PlayStation Portable
 2006
 Sudoku
 Bomberman
 2008
 Dungeon Explorer: Warriors of Ancient Arts

 2009
 Creature Defense

PlayStation 3
 2009
 Bomberman Ultra (PlayStation Network)
 Military Madness: Nectaris (PlayStation Network)

Xbox 360
 2006
 Far East of Eden Ziria: Tales from Distant Jipang
 Bomberman: Act Zero
 2007
 Fuzion Frenzy 2
 Bomberman Live (Xbox Live Arcade)
 Omega Five (Xbox Live Arcade)
2010
Deca Sports Freedom

Mobile Phones
 2000
 Star Soldier
 Super Star Soldier
 
 2000
 
 2001
 
 
 
 
 
 
 
 
 
 
 SUPER i-soccer
 2002
 
 
 
 
 2003
 
 
 
 
 
 
 
 
 
 
 
 Bomberman Jetters Mobile
 2004
 Tengai Makyō: Ziria
 
 
 
 
 
 
 
 
 CC7
 2005
 Bomberman RPG
 
 Momotarou Dentetsu Tokyo
 Momotarou Dentetsu Japan
 2006
 Bonk's Return
 Real3D SnowBoard
 Star Soldier vs DoDonPachi DaiOuJou CARAVAN'06
 Momotarou Dentetsu WORLD
 Momotaro Dentetsu CHUBU
 Maniac Pro Wrestling
 2007
 
 
 
 Bomberman Kart 3D
 
 Momotarou Dentetsu KANTO
 Momotarou Dentetsu TOHOKU
 2008
 Momotaro Dentetsu HOKKAIDO
 
 
 
 2009
 
 Momotarou Dentetsu KYUSHU
 Momotarou Dentetsu SETOUCHI
 2010
 
 
 
 Momotaro Dentetsu KINKI
 STAR SOLDIER MISSION MODE
 Momotaro Dentetsu AOMORI
 2011
 Momotaro Dentetsu SHIZUOKA
 2012
 Momotaro Dentetsu TOKAI

iOS
 2008
 Aqua Forest
 Bomberman Touch
 Catch The Egg
 FB-GIRLs
 Hanafuda-kyo
 Happy Face Popper
 Mahjong Police
 NeoSameGame
 Puzzloop
 Slyder Adventures
 Do The Hudson!!
 2009
 Bomberman Touch 2
 Cake Mania 3
 Crayon Physics Deluxe
 Shot Watch
 2011
 Bomberman Dojo
 Bomberman Chains
 CrossXWorst: Saikyō Densetsu

Android
 2008
 Charlene’s Beachside

References

 
Hudson Soft